Michael Thomas Azinger is an American politician. He is a Republican member of the West Virginia Senate, representing the 3rd district since January 11, 2017. Prior to this, Azinger represented the 10th District in the West Virginia House of Delegates from 2015 to 2017, succeeding his father, Tom Azinger.  Prior to service in the West Virginia legislature, he was a resident of Ohio, where he ran twice for the Sixth Congressional District. In 1998, he was an unsuccessful candidate for the Republican nomination, coming in third behind Lt. Governor Nancy Hollister and former Congressman Frank Cremeans. In 2000, he won the Republican nomination, but failed in his bid to unseat Rep. Ted Strickland, taking only 40% of the vote.

2021 storming of the United States Capitol 
Azinger was present at the armed insurrection at the US Capitol on January 6, 2021. Azinger was attending the Stop the Steal rallies, where he claims he saw no evidence of violence. “The people that are responsible for that were Antifa, and there’s evidence of that,” he said, referring to videos that have made that claim.  “Trump people don’t destroy property. "That’s not what we do. "They've been burning cities for months now." Continuing he said, “I don’t think Trump people broke into the Capitol.”  Both claims have been widely disputed and proven wrong. Over 800 people have been convicted of various crimes. Azinger himself did not enter or walk to the Capitol.

Election results

In 2015, Republican Senator David Nohe resigned just one year into his four year term due to family commitments. Delegate Bob Ashley was appointed to fill the seat until the next regularly scheduled election. Rather than run for the unexpired term, Ashley chose to challenge Senator Donna Boley for a full term in the Senate.  As a result, area businessman Sam Winans and Delegate Azinger ran for the remaining two years on the term. Azinger beat Winans 61-39% to advance to the November general election against Democratic nominee Gregory Smith, former CEO of Mountain State Blue Cross-Blue Shield. Azinger beat Smith 55-45% to win the unexpired term.

References

1965 births
Living people
Protesters in or near the January 6 United States Capitol attack
Politicians from Parkersburg, West Virginia
Baptists from West Virginia
Republican Party West Virginia state senators
Republican Party members of the West Virginia House of Delegates
21st-century American politicians
People from Vienna, West Virginia
Candidates in the 1998 United States elections
Candidates in the 2000 United States elections